HMS Greenwich was a 54-gun fourth-rate ship of the line of the Royal Navy, built by Christopher Pett at Woolwich Dockyard and launched in 1666.

Greenwich was rebuilt at Portsmouth Dockyard in 1699 as a fourth-rate of 46-54 guns. She fought at the action of August 1702 as part of a squadron under Admiral John Benbow, but hung back from the engagement. As a result, her Captain Cooper Wade was tried and convicted of cowardice and shot. On 16 April 1724 she was ordered to be taken to pieces at Chatham, and rebuilt as a 50-gun fourth-rate to the dimensions of the 1719 Establishment, relaunching on 15 February 1730.

On 20 October 1744, whilst preparing to come alongside the hulk , they were struck by hurricane-force winds which caused severe damage to both vessels, which subsequently sank. From Greenwich, Captain Allen and 85 others were drowned.

Notes

References

 Lavery, Brian (2003) The Ship of the Line - Volume 1: The development of the battlefleet 1650-1850. Conway Maritime Press. .
 Michael Phillips. Greenwich (54) (1730). Michael Phillips' Ships of the Old Navy. Retrieved 2 December 2007.

Ships of the line of the Royal Navy
1660s ships